Saint Richardis, also known as Richgard, Richardis of Swabia and Richarde de Souabe in French ( 840 – 18 September, between 894 and 896 AD), was the Holy Roman Empress as the wife of Charles the Fat. She was renowned for her piety and was the first abbess of Andlau.  Repudiated by her husband, Richardis later became a Christian model of devotion and just rule.  She was canonised in 1049.

Life
She was born in Alsace, the daughter of Erchanger, count of the Nordgau, of the family of the Ahalolfinger. She married Charles in 862 and was crowned with him in Rome by Pope John VIII in 881. The marriage was childless.

Charles' reign was marked by internal and external strife, caused primarily by the constant plundering of Norman raiders on the northern French coast.  These attacks had intensified as the aggressors, no longer content to pillage the coastline, had moved their attentions to cities and towns along the rivers.  The Carolingian world was unable to effectively deal with these external threats.

By 887, Charles appears to have succumbed to fits of madness.  During this crisis, Richardis attempted to rule in her husband's stead but was unsuccessful.  In an effort to bring down the over-powerful and hated Liutward, Charles' archchancellor, he and Richardis were accused by Charles and his courtiers of adultery. Charles asserted that their marriage was unconsummated and demanded a divorce.  She was put to the ordeal by fire, which she passed successfully.

Protected by her family, she then withdrew to Andlau Abbey, which she had founded on her ancestral lands in 880, and where her niece Rotrod was abbess. (Richardis herself was previously lay abbess of religious houses at Säckingen and Zurich). She died at Andlau on 18 September and was buried there.

The Legend of Richardis

After her lifetime, a legend grew up around the life of Richardis. The legend relates that, despite being a virtuous wife, her husband continued to accuse her of misconduct. This he did for over ten years. In a bid to assure him of her innocence, she finally assented to an ordeal by fire. Though she was barefoot and wearing a shirt covered in wax, the flames nevertheless refused to touch her. Disheartened by her husband's continued mistrust, Richardis left the imperial palace and wandered into the forest.  There she was visited by an angel, who ordered her to found a convent in a certain spot, which a bear would indicate to her. In Val d'Eleon, at the banks of the river, she saw a bear scratching in the dirt.  There she built the abbey of Andlau.

An alternative legend recounts that Richardis found the mother bear grieving over her dead cub in the forest. When Richardis held the cub, it returned to life.  After the working of this miracle, both mother and cub remained devoted to the saint for the rest of their lives.

However, the abbey had already been founded seven years before her divorce from Charles the Fat, and the area had long been associated with the bear. Incorporating the mythos of the bear, the nuns at Andlau long maintained a live bear and allowed free board and passage to passing bear-keepers. To this day images of the saint are still often accompanied by that of a bear.

Veneration
Richardis was later canonised and remains translated in November 1049 by Pope Leo IX to a more impressive tomb in the newly rebuilt abbey church. The present tomb dates from 1350.

Richardis is patron of Andlau, and of protection against fires. Her iconography refers to her status as an empress and nun and to her ordeal by fire. The bear and ploughshare refer to the foundation legend of Andlau Abbey.

See also

List of Catholic saints
List of Holy Roman Empresses

Notes

Sources

840s births
890s deaths
Ahalolfing dynasty
Carolingian dynasty
Holy Roman Empresses
Frankish queens consort
Angelic visionaries
Female saints of medieval Germany
Alsatian saints
Saints from East Francia
9th-century people from East Francia
9th-century Christian saints
Christian royal saints
Women from the Carolingian Empire